Ellen Perez and Arina Rodionova were the defending champions but Rodionova chose not to participate.

Perez partnered alongside Storm Sanders and successfully defended her title, defeating Desirae Krawczyk and Asia Muhammad in the final, 6–3, 6–2.

Seeds

Draw

Draw

References

External Links
Main Draw

Burnie International - Doubles